Leandra is a town in Gert Sibande District Municipality in the Mpumalanga province of South Africa.

Town some 45 km east-south-east of Springs, comprising the former towns of Eendrag and Leslie. The name is a combination of Leslie and Eendrag.

References

Populated places in the Govan Mbeki Local Municipality